NGC 369 is a spiral galaxy located in the constellation Cetus. It was discovered on October 9, 1885 by Francis Leavenworth. It was described by Dreyer as "very faint, very small, round, gradually brighter middle."

References

0369
18851009
Cetus (constellation)
Spiral galaxies
003856